is a retired Japanese professional shogi player, ranked 7-dan.

Theoretical contributions

Takada is the inventor of the Takada System.

References

External links
 Japan Shogi Association official profile page 
 ShogiHub:
 Takada, Shohei
 Official News Release: Takada Shohei 7-Dan retired
 Shogi Planet's  Evernote document: Takada system

Japanese shogi players
Living people
Retired professional shogi players
Professional shogi players from Tokyo Metropolis
Azabu High School alumni
1962 births